Johan Lind (born 9 January 1942) is a Norwegian speed skater. He was born in Mosjøen and represented the club Hamar IL. He competed in the 500 m at the 1968 Winter Olympics in Grenoble, and at the 1972 Winter Olympics in Sapporo.

References

External links

1942 births
Living people
People from Vefsn
Norwegian male speed skaters
Olympic speed skaters of Norway
Speed skaters at the 1968 Winter Olympics
Speed skaters at the 1972 Winter Olympics
Sportspeople from Nordland